The EDAG Cinema 7D was a four-door hatchback concept car designed by EDAG in 2003.

References

Concept cars
Hatchbacks